The 1903 Auburn Tigers football team represented Auburn University in the 1903 college football season.  The team was coached by William Penn Bates in his only season as Auburn's head coach. The next year Mike Donahue took over for the first of his two coaching stints at Auburn.

Schedule

References

Auburn
Auburn Tigers football seasons
Auburn Tigers football